The 2022 Finswimming World Championships Indoor were held in Cali, Colombia at the Aquatics Centre Hernando Botero O'Byrne from 20 to 23 July 2022.

Belarusian and Russian finswimmers were not allowed to compete at the event after a ban as a result of the Russian invasion of Ukraine.

Medal overview

Men's events

 Swimmers who participated in the heats only and received medals.

Women's events

 Swimmers who participated in the heats only and received medals.

Mixed events

 Swimmers who participated in the heats only and received medals.

Medal table

References

External links
Results – Preliminary heats
Results – Finals

Finswimming World Championships
Finswimming World Championships
Sport in Cali
Finswimming World Championships